Alumni Field is a baseball field located in Keene, New Hampshire, United States. The field, located on Arch Street, was constructed in 1948 and has served as the home of the Keene Swamp Bats of the New England Collegiate Baseball League since the 1997 NECBL season.  The field is part of the athletic facilities at Keene High School and is owned by the Alumni Association.  The football, soccer, and track & field teams of Keene High School also use the facility. It holds a capacity of approximately 4,100 fans.

Wilson Pond is located next to the field on the first base side.  Alumni Field features three separate seating structures.  The main, covered seating section is located on the first base side.  On the third base side, a large, uncovered bleacher-style stand has 15 rows of seating.  The third section is located behind home plate, a pair of smaller uncovered bleacher seating structures.

Alumni Field hosted the 2006 NECBL All-Star Game.  The game, attended by 3,183 fans, was won by the visiting Northern Division 6–2.

Swamp Bats attendance
The following is a list of Swamp Bats attendance figures at Alumni Field dating back to the 2001 season.  The Swamp Bats have played at the facility since 1997, but attendance records date back only to 2001.

References

External links
 Swampbats website
 NECBL website

Baseball venues in New Hampshire
Minor league baseball venues
New England Collegiate Baseball League ballparks
Buildings and structures in Keene, New Hampshire
1948 establishments in New Hampshire
Sports venues completed in 1948